CMC Connect Burson Cohn & Wolfe (CMC BCW) formerly known as CMC Connect Burson-Marsteller  is a public relations firm that provides communication solutions.  The company was founded in 1992 by Yomi Badejo Okusanya in Ikeja, Lagos, Nigeria. In 2015, CMC Connect announced an exclusive affiliation with Burson-Marsteller, a global public relations agency which is now known as Burson Cohn & Wolfe.

References

Companies based in Lagos
1995 establishments in Nigeria
Companies established in 1995
Mass media companies of Nigeria